Mariko Silver served as the tenth president of Bennington College in Bennington, Vermont. She took office in July 2013 as the successor to Elizabeth Coleman. Silver previously held positions at Arizona State University, the United States Department of Homeland Security, the office of the governor of Arizona, and Columbia University. She left Bennington College on July 1, 2019.

Education
Silver attended Yale University, where she received her BA in history in 1999. In 2001, she received her Master of Science degree in Science and Technology Policy from the University of Sussex, and completed her Ph.D. in Economic Geography from the University of California, Los Angeles in 2012. She was awarded an honorary Ph.D. from Hofstra University in 2017.

Career
Dr. Silver became president of Bennington College in July 2013. In 2014, she "led the design of a 10-year strategic plan for the college which emphasizes the education and development of the whole student, integration of curricular and co-curricular experiences, and a redesign of Bennington's signature Field Work Term in which every student must pursue a seven-week internship or work experience every year of their undergraduate studies" During her time as president she claimed that the application pool has grown and that the school had become more diverse, both economically and geographically. Since 2001 the college's enrollment has remained level.

In her previous position as a Senior Advisor to the President at Arizona State University, Silver was involved in what Newsweek called “one of the most radical redesigns in higher learning since the origins of the modern university”, as well as leading initiatives such as an international collaboration on education design, international teaching partnerships, and more.

During her time at the United States Department of Homeland Security in the Obama Administration, Silver led the department's office of International Affairs. She worked on projects in international strategy, negotiation, organization, and collaboration on issues such as counter-terrorism, immigration, cyber-security, and disaster resilience.

As Policy Advisor for Innovation, Higher Education, and Economic Development to Arizona Governor Janet Napolitano, Silver worked on statewide education policy initiatives in areas including "science and technology, innovation policy, economic development and diversification, workforce development, tertiary education, and the creation of a continuum-oriented education system".

Personal life
Silver is married to musician and former public radio producer at KUNM, Thom Loubet. They have two children.

Her father, Tony Silver, was a documentary filmmaker who directed Style Wars (1983). Her mother, Joan Shigekawa, was Senior Deputy Chairman at the National Endowment for the Arts.

References

Year of birth missing (living people)
Living people
Alumni of the University of Sussex
Obama administration personnel
Presidents of Bennington College
United States Department of Homeland Security officials
University of California, Los Angeles alumni
Women heads of universities and colleges
Yale University alumni